Eduardo Andrés Boné Saá (born February 22, 1990 in Esmeraldas) is an Ecuadorian footballer who plays for Mushuc Runa.

Honors

National team
 Ecuador U-20
 Pan American Games: Gold Medal

External links

Bone's FEF player card 

1990 births
Living people
Sportspeople from Esmeraldas, Ecuador
Association football midfielders
Ecuadorian footballers
L.D.U. Quito footballers
C.S.D. Macará footballers
S.D. Aucas footballers
C.D. Clan Juvenil footballers
C.D. ESPOLI footballers
Mushuc Runa S.C. footballers
Pan American Games gold medalists for Ecuador
Pan American Games medalists in football
Footballers at the 2007 Pan American Games
Medalists at the 2007 Pan American Games